Alex Ignatiev (born 1945) is an American physicist currently Distinguished Professor at University of Houston.

References

University of Houston faculty
21st-century American physicists
Russian physicists
1945 births
Living people